Paldal Station is a station of the Daegu Metro Line 3 in Paldal-dong, Buk District, Daegu, South Korea.

External links 

  Cyber station information from Daegu Metropolitan Transit Corporation

Daegu Metro stations
Buk District, Daegu
Daegu Metro Line 3
Railway stations opened in 2015